Cuatro Vientos is an administrative neighborhood of Madrid belonging to the district of Latina.

Geography
Cuatro Vientos is situated in the south-western area of central Madrid, close to the motorways A5 and M40 and to the homonymous airport.

External links
Cuatro Vientos on Google Maps
Infos about the "Museo del Aire"

Wards of Madrid
Latina (Madrid)